{{DISPLAYTITLE:C17H27NO4}}
The molecular formula C17H27NO4 (molar mass: 309.40 g/mol, exact mass: 309.1940 u) may refer to:

 Metipranolol
 Nadolol

Molecular formulas